Stephen Fry is an English actor, comedian, author and television presenter. With Hugh Laurie, as the comedy double act Fry and Laurie, he co-wrote and co-starred in A Bit of Fry & Laurie, and the duo also played the title roles in Jeeves and Wooster. Fry played the lead in the film Wilde, played Melchett in the Blackadder television series, and was the host of celebrity comedy trivia show QI. He has contributed columns and articles for newspapers and magazines, and has written four novels and three autobiographies, Moab Is My Washpot, The Fry Chronicles, and More Fool Me: A Memoir.

Written works

Films and screenplays

Musicals

Books

Plays

Published television scripts

Performances

Film

Documentaries

Television

Theatre

Radio shows
 Hitchhiker's Guide to the Galaxy: Quandary Phase: Murray Bost Henson, BBC Radio 4
 Saturday Night Fry (1988, BBC Radio 4, six episodes)
 A Bit of Fry & Laurie (1994, BBC Radio Four, two half-hour programmes compiled from selected previously-seen sketches from the TV series)
 Absolute Power, BBC Radio Four
 Occasional guest panellist on I'm Sorry I Haven't a Clue, BBC Radio Four
 Regular guest panellist on Just a Minute, BBC Radio Four
 Has a regular slot, The Incomplete and Utter History of Classical Music on Classic FM
 Played the lead, David Lander, on Radio 4 series Delve Special
 A series of "wireless essays", supposedly by his alter ego, the elderly Cambridge philology professor Donald Trefusis, were featured in the BBC Radio 4 programme Loose Ends, hosted by Ned Sherrin
 Fry contributed regular parodies of BBC Radio 1's Newsbeat to the same station's arts programme Studio B15
 Afternoon Play: I Love Stephen Fry (2008, BBC Radio Four)
 Fry's English Delight (10 series, 2008–2019, BBC Radio Four)
 Stephen Fry on the Phone (2011, BBC Radio Four, five episodes)
 Warhorse of Letters, with Daniel Rigby (2011, BBC Radio Four, 12 episodes across 3 series)

Audiobooks
 Moab Is My Washpot (1997) 
 Paperweight Volume 1 (1998) 
 Harry Potter series, UK versions (1999–2007)
 The Hippopotamus (2000) 
 Montmorency (2004) 
 The Hitchhiker's Guide to the Galaxy (2005) 
 Higher Ground Project (2005) 
 The Ode Less Travelled (2006) 
 Paperweight Volume 2 (2007) 
 The Best of Paddington on CD: Complete & Unabridged (2008) 
 Stephen Fry Presents a Selection of Anton Chekhov's Short Stories (Unabridged) (2008)
 Stephen Fry Presents a Selection of Oscar Wilde's Short Stories (Unabridged) (2008)
 The Dongle of Donald Trefusis (Podcasts, 2009)
 The Fry Chronicles: An Autobiography (2010)
 Sherlock Holmes: The Definitive Collection (2017)

Audio dramas
 The Hound of the Baskervilles (2021) as Dr. Watson

Video games
 Destiny 2 – Concierge AI
 Fable – Narrator
 Fable II – Reaver
 Fable III – Reaver
 Harry Potter and the Philosopher's Stone
 Harry Potter and the Prisoner of Azkaban
 Harry Potter and the Goblet of Fire
 LittleBigPlanet – Narrator
 LittleBigPlanet 2 – Narrator
 LittleBigPlanet 3 – Narrator
 LittleBigPlanet PSP – Narrator
 PlayStation All-Stars Battle Royale – Narrator (from LittleBigPlanet)

Miscellaneous
 Fry has a guest appearance in a webcast of Doctor Who called Death Comes to Time, as Time Lord, the Minister of Chance.
 He does the voice of the telephone in the Direct Line adverts alongside Paul Merton, who voices the mouse.
 Fry introduced the television show Wildlife SOS.
 He provided voiceovers for Argos' Christmas adverts in 2007.
 He is the character in the Twinings Earl Grey tea adverts on British TV.
 He performs the voice of "Jeeves" for Voco Clocks' Clocks That Talk.
 He performs on the Bonzo Dog Doo-Dah Band's 2007 album, Pour l'Amour des Chiens.
 Fry appeared in a video entitled Freedom Fry — "Happy birthday to GNU", celebrating the GNU's 25th birthday.
 He provided his voice for the outro of YouTube videos by Charlie McDonnell, used since 2009.
 He recites "50 Words for Snow" off Kate Bush's 2011 album of the same name.
 Fry is also the narrator on the show Pocoyo for seasons 1–2. His first Pocoyo episode he narrated was the pilot episode "Umbrella, Umbrella" and his final Pocoyo episode he narrated was the season 2 finale "Remember When".
 Fry provided narration for the Harry Potter 20th Anniversary: Return to Hogwarts reunion special.

Directorial filmography
 Bright Young Things (director, 2003)

References

External links
 

Bibliographies by writer
Bibliographies of British writers
Arts-related lists
Stephen Fry
Writing-related lists